Taisei Okazaki (born 23 March 1982 in Kagoshima Prefecture）is a Japanese musician,  DJ, and music producer who has produced music with Lord Kimo (the original member of Asian Dub Foundation) since 2009.

He has been ranked #46 in The Greatest DJs in Asia of All Time: Top 100 by Alex Trost and Vadim Kravetsky.
He moved to the party Island "Koh Phangan" in Thailand from Tokyo Japan since 2012 and started a new career as an international artist, DJ and music producer.

Discography

Mainly Release 
 Mirai feat. XXX]
 Houon Kansha feat. George Willams
 Inori Original mix
 Inori feat. Lord Kimo
 Mumyo original mix

Mainly Live History 

 Satsuma Festival（2009）with Lord Kimo Live at Lilac Hotels and Resort in Kagoshima, Japan
 Fullmoon party (2014) at Sunrise Bar in Koh Phangan, Thailand
 The Art of BASS (2015）at Chippendale Hotel in Sydney, Australia
 World Peace Day (2015) at Forsyth Barr Stadium in Dunedin, New Zealand
 Electro Shock Festival (2016) at Oba camp Village in Tokyo, Japan
 Soul Sessions - with Radha Cuadrado Live at 19East (2017) in Manila, Philippines
 Fullmoon party (2017) in Koh Phangan, Thailand
 RAT PPL + Moonroom present: Across the Sea Feat. Taisei Okazaki (2018) at Coaxial Art in Los Angeles, United States

References 
 The Greatest DJs in Asia of All Time: Top 100. 
 Taisei Okazaki Resident Advisor

External links 
 Electro Shock Festival 2016 Lineup on Resident Advisor
 Taisei Okazaki Soundcloud

Japanese record producers
1982 births
Living people